Scott Kurttila (born  1965) is an American former competitive figure skater. Competing in men's singles, he won gold at the 1987 Golden Spin of Zagreb.

Kurttila began skating when he was eleven years old. He won the pewter medal in the junior men's event at the 1985 U.S. Championships and placed sixth at the 1987 Winter Universiade in Czechoslovakia. He was coached by Kathy Casey.

Kurttila ended his competitive career in 1988. In 1992, he tried pair skating with Calla Urbanski but the two decided not to compete together. He studied at Georgetown University and worked at Amazon.com.

Competitive highlights

References 

1960s births
American male single skaters
Living people
Sportspeople from Seattle